The 1928 Lafayette Leopards football team was an American football team that represented Lafayette College as an independent during the 1928 college football season. In its fifth season under head coach Herb McCracken, the team compiled a 6–1–2 record. Richard Guest was the team captain.  The team played its home games at Fisher Field in Easton, Pennsylvania.

Schedule

References

Lafayette
Lafayette Leopards football seasons
Lafayette Leopards football